M'Intosh, McIntosh, MacIntosh, Macintosh, or Mackintosh is a Scottish surname, originating from the Clan Mackintosh. Mac an Tòisich means (son of) leader/chief. Notable people with the surname include:

 Alan McIntosh (born 1939), Welsh footballer
 Alastair McIntosh (born 1955), Scottish writer, academic and activist
 Andrew McIntosh, Baron McIntosh of Haringey (1933–2010), British Labour politician
 Andrew McIntosh (physicist) (born 1952), Professor of Thermodynamics at the University of Leeds and director of Truth in Science
 Bradley McIntosh (born 1981), English-Jamaican singer of S Club 7 fame
 Cameron Mackintosh (born 1946), British theatrical producer
 Carl W. McIntosh (1914–2009), American academic, President of Montana State University (1970–1977)
 Charles Macintosh (1766–1843), Scottish inventor
 Charles Henry Mackintosh (1820–1896), Irish preacher and Christian writer
 Charles Rennie Mackintosh (1868–1928), Scottish architect and designer
 D. N. McIntosh (1822–1896), leader of Creek Confederate regiment in the U. S. Civil War 
 David McIntosh (disambiguation), multiple people
 Donald McIntosh (1838–1876), Canadian-born officer in Custer's 7th Cavalry who was killed at Little Big Horn
 Donald McIntosh (mathematician) (1868–1957), British mathematician
 Doug McIntosh (1945–2021), American basketball player
 E. E. B. Mackintosh (1880–1957), Director of the Science Museum, London
 Erick McIntosh (born 1987), American football player
 Ewart Alan Mackintosh (1893–1917), lieutenant in the British army during the First World War and a war poet
 Gavin MacIntosh (born 1999), American actor and model
 Gordon McIntosh (1925–2019), Australian politician
 Hamish McIntosh (born 1984), Australian rules footballer
 Harold Mackintosh, 1st Viscount Mackintosh of Halifax (1891–1964), son of confectioner John Mackintosh
 Harold V. McIntosh (1929–2015), American physicist working in Mexico
 Hugh McIntosh (disambiguation), multiple people
 James M. McIntosh (1828–1862), Confederate Army general in the American Civil War
 Jennifer McIntosh (born 1991), British sports shooter and Olympian, Scotland's most successful female Commonwealth Games athlete
 John Mackintosh (disambiguation), multiple people
 John McIntosh (disambiguation), multiple people
 Kathaleeya McIntosh (born 1972), Thai–Scottish–Chinese actress, model and TV personality 
 Ken Macintosh (born 1962), Scottish politician
 Ken Mackintosh (1919–2005), English bandleader
 Ken McIntosh, New Zealand rugby league coach
 Kenny McIntosh (born 2000), American football player
 Lachlan McIntosh (1725–1806), American Revolutionary War general and political leader
 Lonnie McIntosh (stage name Lonnie Mack) (1941-2016), American, Rock guitar pioneer
 Lorraine McIntosh (born 1964), Scottish singer of Deacon Blue fame
 Lucy Mackintosh (born 1956), co-owner of Lucy Mackintosh Contemporary Art Gallery, Lausanne, Switzerland
 Maggie McIntosh (born 1947), American politician from Maryland
 Marjorie McIntosh (born 1940), American historian of Great Britain
 Mary Susan McIntosh (1936–2013), British sociologist and feminist
 Murray McIntosh (born 1967), Canadian ice hockey defenceman
 Pat McIntosh, Scottish mystery writer
 Pollyanna McIntosh (born 1979), Scottish actress, writer, and director
 R. J. McIntosh (born 1996), American football player
 Robert Mackintosh ('Red Rob', c. 1745–1807), Edinburgh music composer
 Robert Macintosh (1897–1989), first Nuffield Professor of Anaesthetics, Oxford
 Robert J. McIntosh (1922–2008), U.S. Representative from Michigan 
 Samantha McIntosh, showjumper and equestrian from New Zealand
 Sarah MacIntosh (born 1969), British diplomat
 Stephanie McIntosh (born 1985), Australian singer
 Susan McIntosh, American anthropologist and archaeologist
 Sylvester McIntosh (1934–2017), United States Virgin Islands musician
 Tim McIntosh (baseball), American baseball player
 Tim McIntosh (cricketer), a New Zealand cricketer
 Thomas McIntosh (footballer) Scottish footballer
 Trudy McIntosh (born 1984), Australian artistic gymnast
 William M'Intosh (also spelt McIntosh) (1838–1931), Scottish physician and marine zoologist
 William McIntosh (1775–1825), Chief of the Lower Creek Indians
 William Priestly MacIntosh (1857–1930), Australian sculptor
 Willy McIntosh (born 1970), Thai–Scottish–Chinese actor, model and TV personality 
 W. S. McIntosh (1921–1974), civil rights leader in Dayton, Ohio
 Winston Hubert McIntosh (1944–1987), better known as Peter Tosh, Jamaican reggae musician

Anglicised Scottish Gaelic-language surnames